The 2001 Southland Conference men's basketball tournament took place March 6–10, 2001. The quarterfinal rounds were played at the home arena of the higher seeded-teams, with the semifinals and championship game played at CenturyTel Center in Bossier City, Louisiana.

Sixth-seeded  won the championship game over top-seeded , and earned the conference's automatic bid to the NCAA tournament. Michael Byars-Dawson of Northwestern State was named the tournament's MVP.

Format
The top eight eligible men's basketball teams in the Southland Conference received a berth in the conference tournament.  After the conference season, teams were seeded by conference record.

Bracket

References

Tournament
Southland Conference men's basketball tournament
Southland Conference men's basketball tournament
Southland Conference men's basketball tournament